Perinthalmanna Taluk, formerly known as Walluvanad Taluk, comes under Perinthalmanna revenue division in Malappuram district of Kerala, India. Its headquarters is the town of Perinthalmanna. Perinthalmanna Taluk contains Perinthalmanna Municipality and 15 Gram panchayats. Most of the administrative offices are located in the Mini-Civil Station at Perinthalmanna.

Geography

Perinthalmanna Taluk is bounded by Kadalundi River (Eranad Taluk) to north, Thuthapuzha River (a tributary of Bharathappuzha) to south, Kuttippuram block of Tirur Taluk to west, and Mannarkkad Taluk (Silent Valley) to east.

History

Perinthalmanna was the headquarters of the Old Walluvanad Taluk in the British Malabar District. Walluvanad Taluk was divided into six Revenue blocks: Mankada, Perinthalmanna, Mannarkkad, Ottapalam, Sreekrishnapuram, and Pattambi. Walluvanad was one of the two Taluks included in the Malappuram Revenue Division (the other being Eranad Taluk) of British Malabar. On 1 November 1957, the Walluvanad Taluk was divided into two: Perinthalmanna Taluk and Ottapalam Taluk. The Revenue blocks of Mankada, Perinthalmanna, and Mannarkkad were included in the Perinthalmanna Taluk, while Ottapalam, Sreekrishnapuram, and Pattambi were transferred to the newly formed Ottapalam Taluk. Later Attappadi Revenue block was separated from Mannarkkad Block.

During the formation of Malappuram district on 16 June 1969, it was separated from Palakkad district and Revenue blocks of Mannarkkad and Attappadi were separated from Perinthalmanna Taluk to form Mannarkkad Taluk. Now, Perinthalmanna Taluk has 24 villages.

Municipality and panchayats
The taluk contains 1 municipality and 15 panchayats:

 Perinthalmanna Municipality
 Alipparamba Panchayath
 Angadippuram Panchayath
 Edappatta Panchayath
 Elamkulam Panchayath
 Keezhattur Panchayath
  Kodur Panchayath
 Koottilangadi Panchayath
 Kuruva Panchayath
 Mankada Panchayath
 Melattur Panchayath
 Moorkkanad Panchayath
 Pulamanthole Panchayath
 Puzhakkattiri Panchayath
 Tazhekkode Panchayath
 Vettathur Panchayath

Villages
The taluk contains 24 villages:

 Aliparamba
 Anamangad
 Angadippuram
 Arakkuparamba
 Edappatta
 Elamkulam
 Kariavattom
 Keezhattur
 Kodur
 Koottilangadi
 Kuruva
 Kuruvambalam
 Mankada
 Melattur
 Moorkkanad
 Nenmini
 Pathaikara
 Perinthalmanna Town
 Pulamantol
 Puzhakkattiri
 Thazhekode
 Vadakkangara
 Valambur
 Vettathur

Taluks of Malappuram

Historical maps

See also 
 List of villages in Malappuram district
 List of Gram Panchayats in Malappuram district
 List of desoms in Malappuram district (1981)
 Revenue Divisions of Kerala

References

Taluks of Kerala